The Union of Nationalist Federalists of the Congo is a political party in the Democratic Republic of the Congo. The party won 7 out of 500 seats in the 2006 parliamentary elections. In the 2011 elections the party won 8 seats, and in the 2018 elections party didn't win any seats. President of the party is Gabriel Kyungu wa Kumwanza.

References

Federalism in the Democratic Republic of the Congo
Federalist parties
Political parties in the Democratic Republic of the Congo
Political parties with year of establishment missing